Public holidays in Åland include:

Åland
Åland-related lists
Åland law
Åland